Steffi Graf was the defending champion but did not compete that year.

Lindsay Davenport won in the final 6–2, 6–1 against Irina Spîrlea.

Seeds
A champion seed is indicated in bold text while text in italics indicates the round in which that seed was eliminated. The top nine seeds received a bye to the second round.

  Arantxa Sánchez Vicario (semifinals)
  Conchita Martínez (quarterfinals)
  Anke Huber (third round)
  Lindsay Davenport (champion)
  Iva Majoli (third round)
  Irina Spîrlea (final)
 n/a
  Amanda Coetzer (second round)
  Mary Joe Fernández (semifinals)
  Barbara Paulus (second round)
  Kimberly Po (third round)
  Elena Likhovtseva (third round)
  Nathalie Tauziat (quarterfinals)
  Ruxandra Dragomir (third round)
  Chanda Rubin (third round)
  Lisa Raymond (second round)
  Ai Sugiyama (second round)

Draw

Finals

Top half

Section 1

Section 2

Bottom half

Section 3

Section 4

References
 1997 State Farm Evert Cup Draw

Singles
1997 Newsweek Champions Cup and the State Farm Evert Cup